Albert Ramos was the defending champion but chose to compete in Wimbledon instead.
Tommy Robredo won the final 6–3, 6–0 against Martín Alund.

Seeds

Draw

Finals

Top half

Bottom half

References
 Main Draw
 Qualifying Draw

Aspria Tennis Cup Trofeo City Life - Singles
2012 Singles